Hualou Subdistrict is a subdistrict in Jianghan District, Wuhan, Hubei, China.

References

Subdistricts of the People's Republic of China
Township-level divisions of Hubei
Jianghan District